Milan Blagojević (born 27 July 1929) is a Serbian former basketball player. He represented the Yugoslavia national basketball team internationally.

Playing career 
Blagojević played for Belgrade-based teams Partizan and Crvena zvezda of the Yugoslav First League. During his stint with Crvena zvezda he won two Yugoslav Championships.

National team career
Blagojević was a member of the Yugoslavia national team that participated at the 1954 FIBA World Championship in Buenos Aires, Argentina. Over three tournament games, he averaged 4.7 points per game.

Career achievements and awards 
 Yugoslav League champion: 2 (with Crvena zvezda: 1947, 1948).

See also 
 Blagojević (family name)

References

External links 
 Milan Blagojevic at partizanopedia.rs

1929 births
Living people
KK Crvena zvezda players
KK Partizan players
Serbian men's basketball players
Yugoslav men's basketball players
1954 FIBA World Championship players